Shannon Shakespeare (born May 6, 1977) is a Canadian former competitive swimmer and freestyle specialist.  Shakespeare competed for Canada at two consecutive Summer Olympics in 1996 and 2000.  At the 1996 Summer Olympics in Atlanta, Georgia, she finished in 17th position in the 100-metre freestyle, 5th place in the 4x200 metre freestyle and 4x100 metre medley relays, and 7th place in the 4x100 metre freestyle relay. A key member of the Canadian women's relay teams in the 1990s, Shakespeare won a gold medal in the 4x200 metre freestyle relay  at the 1995 World Championships. She also won a bronze medal in the 50-metre freestyle and 4x100-metre freestyle relay in the 1994 Commonwealth Games.  She was the Canadian champion in the women's 50, 100, and 200-metre freestyle, and a 23-time All American while swimming at the University of Michigan.

Shakespeare was inducted into the Manitoba Sports Hall of Fame in 2013.

See also
 List of World Aquatics Championships medalists in swimming (women)
 List of Commonwealth Games medallists in swimming (women)

References

External links
 
 
 
 

1977 births
Living people
Canadian female freestyle swimmers
Medalists at the FINA World Swimming Championships (25 m)
Michigan Wolverines women's swimmers
Olympic swimmers of Canada
Sportspeople from British Columbia
Swimmers at the 1995 Pan American Games
Swimmers at the 1996 Summer Olympics
Swimmers at the 2000 Summer Olympics
Commonwealth Games medallists in swimming
Commonwealth Games bronze medallists for Canada
Pan American Games silver medalists for Canada
Swimmers at the 1994 Commonwealth Games
Pan American Games medalists in swimming
Medalists at the 1995 Pan American Games
Medallists at the 1994 Commonwealth Games